Channing (also known as The Young and the Bold) is an hour-long American drama series that aired at 10:00 p.m. on ABC from September 18, 1963 to April 8, 1964. The series depicted life at fictitious Channing College, with Jason Evers in the lead role of Professor Joseph Howe, and Henry Jones as Fred Baker, the dean of the institution.

Channing, a production of Revue Studios, aired during the same time frame as the first season of NBC's somewhat similar offering, Mr. Novak.

Cast
 Henry Jones as Dean Fred Baker
 Jason Evers as Professor Joseph Howe

Jones and Evers were the only regulars.

Notable guest stars

 Leo G. Carroll as Professor John Miller
 Yvonne Craig as Kathy O'Reardon
 Keir Dullea as Larry Franklin
 Joey Heatherton as Lynn Walton
 Leslie Nielsen as Professor Paul Stafford
 Suzanne Pleshette as Laurie Moore
 Marion Ross as Assistant Dean Ryker
 Dawn Wells as Nancy Kyle
 Joyce Bulifant
 James Caan
 John Cassavetes
 Michael Constantine
 Ellen Corby
 Noreen Corcoran
 Tim Conway
 Bob Crane
 Pete Duel
 Peter Fonda
 Mark Goddard
 Joan Hackett
 Barbara Harris
 Mariette Hartley
 Peter Helm
 Rafer Johnson
 James Earl Jones
 Peggy McCay
 Ralph Meeker

 Agnes Moorehead
 Greg Morris
 Leela Naidu
 Ed Nelson
 Leslie Nielsen
 Michael Parks (two episodes as Dante Donati)
 Suzanne Pleshette
 Michael J. Pollard
 Denver Pyle
 Chris Robinson
 Telly Savalas
 George Segal
 William Shatner
 Tom Simcox
 Forrest Tucker 
 Elen Willard

Episodes

Production notes
Stanley Rubin (Bracken's World) was the executive producer; Jack Laird (Ben Casey and Kojak), the producer, and Bob Rafelson (the film Five Easy Pieces), the associate producer.

References

External links 
 

1963 American television series debuts
1964 American television series endings
1960s American drama television series
American Broadcasting Company original programming
1960s American college television series
Black-and-white American television shows
English-language television shows
Television series by Universal Television